Martin Moszkowicz (born 25 April 1958) is a German film producer. He is the chairman of the executive board at Constantin Film. On 6 March 2019, he was appointed honorary professor at University of Television and Film Munich.

In Las Vegas, April 25, 2022, Moszkowicz received CinemaCon “Career Achievement in Film Award” for his work and continuing success at the global box office.

As producer, executive producer, and co-producer Moszkowicz has been involved in well over 300 nationally and internationally successful feature films and numerous television shows. Recent projects include Resident Evil: The Final Chapter, Fack ju Göhte 3, This Crazy Heart, How About Adolf?, Polar, The Collini Case, The Silence, Das perfekte Geheimnis, Dragon Rider, and Monster Hunter.

Filmography 

 1980: Inflation im Paradies (directed by Nikolai Müllerschön) - Producer
 1982: Der Fan (directed by Eckhart Schmidt) - Producer 
 1983: Rote Rosen für ein Callgirl (directed by Bobby Suarez) - Producer
 1983: Das Gold der Liebe (directed by Eckhart Schmidt) - Producer
 1983: The Revolt of Job (directed by Imre Gyöngyössy, Barna Kabay) - Co-Producer
 1984: Ein irres Feeling (directed by Nikolai Müllerschön) - Producer
 1984: Der Havarist (directed by Wolf-Eckhart Bühler) - Executive Producer
 1984:  (directed by Burkhard Driest) - Executive Producer
 1984:  ( Hijacked to Hell, directed by Helmut Ashley) - Executive Producer
 1985:  (directed by Eckhart Schmidt) - Producer
 1985: Orfeo (directed by Claude Goretta) - Producer
 1985: Die Küken kommen (directed by Eckhart Schmidt) - Producer
 1987: Hatschipuh (directed by Ulrich König) - Producer
 1988:  (directed by Robert van Ackeren) - Producer
 1990:  (directed by Egon Günther) - Co-Producer
 1991: Manta, Manta (directed by Wolfgang Büld) - Producer
 1991: Salt on Our Skin (directed by Andrew Birkin) - Producer
 1992: Ein Fall für TKKG: Drachenauge (directed by Ulrich König) - Executive Producer
 1993: The Cement Garden (directed by Andrew Birkin) - Executive Producer
 1993:  (directed by Sönke Wortmann) - Co-Producer
 1993: Body of Evidence (directed by Uli Edel)
 1993: The House of the Spirits (directed by Bille August) - Co-Producer
 1994: Der bewegte Mann (directed by Sönke Wortmann) - Executive Producer
 1994:  (directed by Ralf Hüttner) - Executive Producer
 1996: The Superwife (directed by Sönke Wortmann) - Producer
 1996: A Girl Called Rosemary (TV, directed by Bernd Eichinger) - Executive Producer
 1996:  (TV, directed by Urs Egger) - Co-Producer
 1996:  (TV, directed by Sönke Wortmann) - Executive Producer
 1997: Smilla's Sense of Snow (directed by Bille August) - Producer
 1997: Babes' Petrol (directed by Peter F. Bringmann) - Producer
 1997: Prince Valiant (directed by Anthony Hickox) - Co-Executive Producer
 1997:  (directed by Gernot Roll / Tom Gerhardt) - Producer
 1997: It Happened in Broad Daylight (TV, directed by Nico Hofmann) - Executive Producer
 1997: Der Campus (directed by Sönke Wortmann) - Producer
 1998: Opernball (TV, directed by Urs Egger) - Producer
 1998: Am I Beautiful? (directed by Doris Dörrie) - Producer
 1998: Wrongfully Accused (directed by Pat Proft) - Executive Producer
 1999:  (directed by Bernd Eichinger) - Co-Producer
 1999: Hausmeister Krause – Ordnung muss sein (TV series, directed by Tom Gerhardt, Hermann Weigel) - Producer
 2000: Time Share (directed by Sharon von Wietersheim)
 2000: Ants in the Pants (directed by Marc Rothemund) - Co-Producer
 2000:  (directed by Michael Herbig) - Co-Producer
 2000: The Calling (directed by Richard Caesar) - Producer
 2000:  (directed by Marco Petry)
 2000: The Mists of Avalon (TV, directed by Uli Edel)
 2000: Slap Her... She's French (directed by Melanie Mayron)
 2000: Thema Nr. 1 (directed by Maria Bachmann)
 2001: Vera Brühne (TV, directed by Hark Bohm) - Executive Producer
 2001: Nowhere in Africa (directed by Caroline Link) - Co-Producer
 2001: Der Schuh des Manitu (directed by Michael Herbig) 
 2001: Mädchen, Mädchen (directed by Dennis Gansel)
 2001: Erkan und Stefan gegen die Mächte der Finsternis (directed by Axel Sand) - Co-Producer
 2001:  (directed by Carlo Rola) - Executive Producer
 2001: Knallharte Jungs (directed by Granz Henman) - Executive Producer
 2004: Resident Evil: Apocalypse (directed by Alexander Witt) - Executive Producer
 2004: Downfall (directed by Oliver Hirschbiegel)
 2005:  (directed by Doris Dörrie) - Executive Producer
 2005: The White Masai (directed by Hermine Huntgeburth) - Executive Producer
 2006: Perfume: The Story of a Murderer (directed by Tom Tykwer) - Executive Producer
 2006: Hui Buh das Schlossgespenst (directed by ) - Co-Producer
 2006: DOA: Dead or Alive (directed by Corey Yuen) - Executive Producer
 2006: Atomised (directed by Oskar Roehler) - Executive Producer
 2006:  (directed by Marcus H. Rosenmüller) - Co-Producer
 2006: Der Räuber Hotzenplotz (directed by Gernot Roll)
 2007: Why Men Don't Listen and Women Can't Read Maps (directed by Leander Haußmann) - Executive Producer
 2007: Resident Evil: Extinction (directed by Russell Mulcahy) - Executive Producer
 2007: Pornorama (directed by Marc Rothemund) - Executive Producer
 2007: Herr Bello (directed by Ben Verbong) - Executive Producer
 2007: Neues vom Wixxer (directed by Cyrill Boss, Philipp Stennert)
 2007:  (directed by Granz Henman)
 2008: The Baader Meinhof Complex (directed by Uli Edel) - Executive Producer
 2008: A Year Ago in Winter (directed by Caroline Link) - Producer
 2008: The Wave (directed by Dennis Gansel) - Co-Producer
 2008: A Woman in Berlin (directed by Max Färberböck) - Executive Producer
 2008: Freche Mädchen (directed by Ute Wieland) - Executive Producer
 2008: Urmel voll in Fahrt (directed by Reinhard Kloos, Holger Tappe) - Executive Producer
 2009: Die Perlmuttfarbe (directed by Marcus H. Rosenmüller) - Co-Producer
 2009: Effi Briest (directed by Hermine Huntgeburth) - Executive Producer
 2009:  (directed by Gernot Roll, Mario Barth) - Executive Producer
 2009:  (directed by Christian Ditter) - Co-Producer
 2009:  (directed by ) - Co-Producer
 2009: Pandorum (directed by Christian Alvart) - Executive Producer
 2009: Pope Joan (directed by Sönke Wortmann) - Producer
 2009:  (directed by Bettina Oberli) - Co-Producer
 2009: Vicky the Viking (directed by Michael Herbig) - Executive Producer
 2009:  (directed by Leander Haußmann) - Executive Producer
 2010: Zeiten ändern dich (directed by Uli Edel) - Executive Producer
 2010:  (directed by Christian Ditter) - Co-Producer
 2010: The Hairdresser (directed by Doris Dörrie) - Executive Producer
 2010: Hier kommt Lola (directed by Franziska Buch) - Co-Producer
 2010: Tiger-Team – Der Berg der 1000 Drachen (directed by Peter Gersina) - Executive Producer
 2010: Freche Mädchen 2 (directed by Ute Wieland) - Executive Producer
 2010: Resident Evil: Afterlife 3D (directed by Paul W. S. Anderson) - Executive Producer
 2010: Benvenuti al Sud (directed by Luca Miniero) - Co-Producer
 2010: Die Superbullen (directed by Gernot Roll) - Executive Producer
 2010: Animals United (directed by Reinhard Kloos, Holger Trappe) - Executive Producer
 2011: Francesco e il Papa (documentary) (directed by Ciro Cappellari) - Executive Producer
 2011: Werner – Eiskalt! (directed by Gernot Roll) - Executive Producer
 2011: The Three Musketeers (directed by Paul W. S. Anderson) - Executive Producer
 2011: Carnage (directed by Roman Polanski) - Co-Producer
 2011: Vicky and the Treasure of the Gods (directed by Christian Ditter) - Executive Producer
 2012: Blutzbrüdaz (directed by Özgür Yıldırım) - Executive Producer
 2012:  (directed by Doris Dörrie) - Executive Producer
 2012:  (directed by Bora Dağtekin) - Executive Producer
 2012: Der Bernd (Dokumentation) (directed by Carlos Gerstenhauer) - Producer
 2012: Das Hochzeitsvideo (directed by Sönke Wortmann) - Executive Producer
 2012: Resident Evil: Retribution (directed by Paul W. S. Anderson) - Executive Producer
 2012: Heiter bis Wolkig (directed by Marco Petry) - Executive Producer
 2012: Agent Ranjid rettet die Welt (directed by Michael Karen) - Co-Producer, Executive Producer
 2013: Fünf Freunde 2 (directed by Mike Marzuk) - Co-Producer
 2013: Windstorm (directed by Katja von Garnier) - Co-Producer
 2013: The Mortal Instruments: City of Bones (directed by Harald Zwart) - Executive Producer
 2013: 3096 Days (directed by Sherry Hormann) - Producer
 2013: Fack ju Göhte (directed by Bora Dağtekin) - Executive Producer
 2014: Tarzan 3D (directed by Reinhard Kloos) - Executive Producer
 2014: Pompeii (directed by Paul W. S. Anderson) - Executive Producer
 2014: Fünf Freunde 3 (directed by Mike Marzuk) - Co-Producer
 2014: Therapy Crashers (directed by Anno Saul) - Executive Producer
 2014: Wrecked (directed by Sönke Wortmann) - Executive Producer
 2014: Love, Rosie (directed by Christian Ditter) - Executive Producer
 2014:  (directed by ) - Executive Producer
 2015: Frau Müller muss weg! (directed by Sönke Wortmann) - Executive Producer
 2015: Fünf Freunde 4 (directed by Mike Marzuk) - Co-Producer
 2015: Ostwind 2 (directed by Katja von Garnier) - Co-Producer
 2015: Fack ju Göhte 2 (directed by Bora Dağtekin) - Executive Producer
 2015: Look Who's Back (directed by David Wnendt) - Executive Producer
 2015: Bruder vor Luder (directed by Heiko Lochmann and Thomas Lochmann, co-directed by Thomas Erhart) - Executive Producer
 2016: Shadowhunters (TV series) - Producer
 2016: Gut zu Vögeln (directed by Mira Thiel) - Executive Producer
 2016: Verrückt nach Fixi (directed by Mike Marzuk) - Co-Producer
 2017: Resident Evil: The Final Chapter (directed by Paul W. S. Anderson) - Executive Producer
 2017:  (directed by Andreas Dresen) - Executive Producer
 2017: Tiger Girl (directed by Jakob Lass) - Executive Producer
 2017: Axolotl Overkill (directed by Helene Hegemann) - Executive Producer
 2017: Jugend ohne Gott (directed by Alain Gsponer) - Executive Producer
 2017: Ostwind – Aufbruch nach Ora (directed by Katja von Garnier) - Co-Producer
 2017: Tigermilch (directed by Ute Wieland) - Executive Producer
 2017:  (directed by Leander Haußmann) - Executive Producer
 2017: Fack ju Göhte 3 (directed by Bora Dağtekin) - Executive Producer
 2017: This Crazy Heart (directed by Marc Rothemund) - Producer
 2018: Nur Gott kann mich richten (directed by Özgur Yildrim) - Co-Producer
 2018: Verpiss Dich, Schneewittchen (directed by Cüneyt Kaya) - Executive Producer
 2018: Asphaltgorillas (directed by Detlev Buck) - Executive Producer
 2018: Fünf Freunde und das Tal der Dinosaurier (directed by Mike Marzuk) - Co-Producer
 2018:  (directed by Sönke Wortmann) - Executive Producer
 2019: Polar (directed by Jonas Akerlund) - Executive Producer
 2019: Ostwind – Aris Ankunft (directed by Theresa von Eltz) - Co-Producer
 2019: The Collini Case (directed by Marco Kreuzpaintner) - Executive Producer
 2019: The Silence (directed by John R. Leonetti) - Executive Producer
 2019: Die Drei !!! (directed by Viviane Andereggen) - Executive Producer
 2019: Eine ganz heiße Nummer 2.0 (directed by Rainer Kaufmann) - Co-Producer
 2019: Das perfekte Geheimnis (directed by Bora Dağtekin) - Executive Producer
 2019: Berlin, Berlin (directed by Franziska Meyer Price) - Co-Producer
 2020: Dragon Rider (directed by Tomer Eshed) - Executive Producer
 2020: Haven – Above Sky (directed by Tim Fehlbaum) - Executive Producer
 2020: Monster Hunter (directed by Paul W. S. Anderson) - Executive Producer
 2021: Resident Evil: Welcome to Raccoon City - Executive Producer

References

External links 
 
 https://www.filmportal.de/en/person/martin-moszkowicz_f3013a3f14b48ab5e03053d50b372643
 https://www.spiegel.de/kultur/martin-moszkowicz-und-die-unvorstellbare-liebe-seiner-eltern-a-00000000-0002-0001-0000-000174316821

1958 births
Living people
German film producers
Film people from Berlin